Smidjegrav Arena is an indoor sporting arena located in Mora, Sweden.  The capacity of the arena is 4,500 and it was built in 1967.  It is the home arena of the Mora IK ice hockey team. It was one of two sites for the 2007 World Junior Ice Hockey Championships, along with Ejendals Arena in Leksand.

The venue was renamed Smidjegrav Arena on 26 June 2015 following the expiration of FM Mattsson's naming rights deal.

References

External links
Hockeyarenas.net entry

Indoor ice hockey venues in Sweden
Buildings and structures in Dalarna County
Sports venues completed in 1967
1967 establishments in Sweden